Carlos Mauricio Funes Cartagena (born 18 October 1959) is a Salvadoran politician and former journalist who served as President of El Salvador from 2009 to 2014. Funes won the 2009 presidential election as the candidate of the left-wing Farabundo Martí National Liberation Front (FMLN) party and took office on 1 June 2009.

Early life and education 
Funes was born in San Salvador. He received his high school diploma (Bachillerato) from the Externado San José, and studied at Universidad Centroamericana but did not graduate. Both Externado and UCA are Jesuit institutions, something that has deeply influenced president Funes. In this respect, Funes has mentioned his relationship to the Jesuits murdered by the Salvadoran military in 1989 as of particular significance in his professional and personal development. In 1994 he was awarded the Maria Moors Cabot prize from Columbia University for promoting press freedom and inter-American understanding.

Funes' brother was killed during the Salvadoran Civil War. His oldest son, Alejandro Funes Velasco, who was 27 years old, died after being murdered in Paris, where he was studying photography.

Career in journalism
Prior to his involvement with politics of El Salvador, Funes was a journalist who hosted a popular interview show on television. He made appearances on Channel 12 and CNN en Español, and also hosted local news programs which were critical of previous governments. He was a reporter during the Salvadoran Civil War and interviewed leftist rebel leaders. It was during this time that he became more sympathetic to leftists in El Salvador, and he considers himself to be center-left.

Political career
Funes was nominated to be the FMLN candidate on 28 September 2007 and competed against the Nationalist Republican Alliance's candidate Rodrigo Ávila, a former deputy director of the National Police. Funes won the 2009 presidential election with 51.32% of the popular vote, thus winning election in a single round.  He was the country's second left-leaning president (the first being Arturo Araujo), as well as the first FMLN party leader not to have fought in the Salvadoran civil war.  His swearing-in on 1 June marked only the third time in the country's history that a governing party peacefully transferred power to the opposition.

His presidential campaign was highlighted by statements endorsing moderate political policies. He has promised to better programs such as health care in rural areas and crime prevention. Political opponents stated that Funes' election would herald an era of Venezuelan influence but he insisted that "integration with Central America and strengthening relations with North America will be the priority of our foreign policy". Funes has also promised to keep the U.S. dollar as El Salvador's official currency (dollarization took place in 2001 under President Francisco Flores Pérez).

Since coming to power, Funes' administration has implemented a wide range of social reforms designed to combat poverty and inequality, including the institution of various poverty alleviation programs in the most impoverished communities, the abolition of public health care fees, the introduction of free shoes, meals and uniforms for schoolchildren, the distribution of property titles to hundreds of families, the introduction of monthly stipends and job training for those living in extreme poverty, and pensions for the elderly. In addition, investments have been made in improving school infrastructure, a presidential decree has been made against discrimination on the basis of gender and sexual orientation in the public services, two working groups on indigenous affairs have been created as a means of bringing about better representation of the interests of El Salvador's indigenous communities, a community health plan has been introduced, improvements have been made in teacher's salaries, and measures have been introduced to combat illiteracy.

According to the United Nations Development Programme (UNDP), the poverty rate dropped by six percentage points to 40 per cent in 2014.

Upon his inauguration on 1 June 2009, Funes resumed Salvadoran diplomatic relations with Cuba. El Salvador previously suspended diplomatic relations with Cuba 50 years ago due to the Cuban Revolution.

In November 2009, President Funes had to face the natural disaster that greatly affected communities in Cuscatlán, San Salvador and San Vicente as a result of the rain brought by Hurricane Ida.  A community in San Vicente called Verapaz disappeared because it was buried by huge rocks that fell from the nearby volcano.  Civil Protection, which is the government entity in charge of handling catastrophes, rehabilitated public schools in which refugees stayed for more than 3 months while they found a place to stay from family or friends. The Army and the Red Cross of El Salvador rescued many people from the communities.

A pension was created for soldiers and guerrillas maimed during the civil war. On the anniversary of the peace agreement, Mauricio Funes acknowledged on behalf of the state the participation of the Armed Forces in war crimes and apologized to the victims. He was criticized by the leader of the right-wing opposition, Armando Calderón, who said that "the State should never apologize.

Funes has been criticized for lack of a plan to fight El Salvador's increased crime.  In response, the President has ordered the deployment of the army to cooperate with police authorities in their fight against crime.
More recently, there have been reports of newly formed death squads operating in El Salvador, due in part to a lack of response of the police.

In January 2010, after a public denouncement of Funes' former cabinet member Francisco Gómez, local Salvadoran media uncovered plans whereby almost all government publicity and advertising were to be carried, without any previous public solicitation (as required by Salvadoran Law), by advertising agency Polistepeque, S.A. de C.V. Some advisers to the president are members of its board of directors, and allegedly Funes himself has some participation through stock in that agency.

The President reacted to these accusations by stating that no other advertising agency in El Salvador has the experience or capacity to manage government publicity and advertising, despite the fact that El Salvador has many local and international advertising agencies such as BBDO.

In 2016, Funes denied giving perks to gangs during the 2012–14 truce.

Personal life
He was married to Vanda Pignato, the former First Lady of El Salvador who was involved in the Workers' Party in Brazil. They have one son, Gabriel. In October 2014, Funes publicly acknowledged that he and Pignato had separated. The political asylum granted to Mauricio Funes by the Government of Nicaragua, included this benefit for his partner, Ada Mitchell Guzmán Sigüenza, as well as his three sons. In July 2019, Funes (along with his wife and two sons) became a naturalized citizen of Nicaragua, where he and his immediate family have been residing in exile since 2014.

Illicit enrichment charges
On 10 February 2016 the El Salvador Supreme Court ruled that Funes would face a civil trial for charges of illegally laundering more than $700,000 in personal bank accounts. Nicaragua has granted political asylum to Mauricio Funes, who is being accused of illicit enrichment in El Salvador. Mauricio Funes has not been able to justify personal transactions for over $600,000. The formal accusation against Mauricio Funes states that he and his family increased their assets without justification for an amount of over US$728,000. The income of the President of El Salvador in 2015, one year after Mauricio Funes left office, was US$5,181.72 per month. On 28 November 2017, El Salvador's second civil court found Funes guilty of illegal enrichment. The sentence was against Mauricio Funes and his son who is with him in Nicaragua under asylum protection, ordering that they had to restitute $420,000 to the state. As of 2019 Interpol has twice rejected the arrest request against Mauricio Funes.

References

External links

 MauricioFunes.org – Official Mauricio Funes Website
 Official Campaign Website 
 Biography of Mauricio Funes by CIDOB (in Spanish)
 First President from the Left Elected in San Salvador by Katie Kohlstedt, 6 June 2009
 El Salvador Rising by Tom Hayden, The Nation, 15 June 2009
El Salvador’s 'Date with History' by Oscar Faria, Workers World, 2 July 2009

1959 births
Living people
People from San Salvador
Salvadoran Roman Catholics
Farabundo Martí National Liberation Front politicians
Presidents of El Salvador
Salvadoran Christian socialists
Catholic socialists
Salvadoran journalists
Male journalists
Maria Moors Cabot Prize winners
Salvadoran politicians convicted of crimes
Central American University alumni
Salvadoran exiles
Salvadoran expatriates in Nicaragua